Antonio Oliverio García de Almeida  (born 3 March 1964) is a Brazilian politician. He is the governor of the state of Roraima and member of the Progressive Party. A nationalist who opposes immigration, Denarium has advocated for closing Brazil's border with Venezuela in response to the Venezuelan refugee crisis. The inflow of migrants means that Roraima has a disproportionately higher Venezuelan Brazillian population compared to the rest of Brazil.

Denarium divested himself from PSL on 28 June 2020.

References

External links
 
  (in Portuguese)

Brazilian political people
1964 births
Living people
Social Liberal Party (Brazil) politicians
Governors of Roraima